Synuchus melantho is a species of ground beetle in the subfamily Harpalinae. It was described by Henry Walter Bates in 1883.

References

Synuchus
Beetles described in 1883